In fluid dynamics, Lamb vector is the cross product of vorticity vector and velocity vector of the flow field, named after the physicist Horace Lamb. The Lamb vector is defined as

It appears in the Navier–Stokes equations through the material derivative term, specifically via convective acceleration term,

In irrotational flows, the Lamb vector is zero, so does in Beltrami flows. The concept of Lamb vector is widely used in turbulent flows. The Lamb vector is analogous to electric field, when the Navier–Stokes equation is compared with Maxwell's equations.

Properties of Lamb vector
The divergence of the lamb vector can be derived from vector identities,

At the same time, the divergence can also be obtained  from Navier–Stokes equation by taking its divergence.

where

References

Fluid dynamics
Vector calculus